Christian Kubusch (born 26 April 1988) is a German freestyle swimmer who won a silver medal in the 800 m freestyle at the 2010 European Aquatics Championships, setting a national record. He also competed at the 2008 Summer Olympics in two events but was eliminated in preliminaries.

References

External links
 
 
 Swimming results for Christian Kubusch

1988 births
German male swimmers
Swimmers at the 2008 Summer Olympics
German male freestyle swimmers
Olympic swimmers of Germany
Living people
European Aquatics Championships medalists in swimming
Sportspeople from Gera
20th-century German people
21st-century German people